State council elections were held in Malaya from 27 September to 12 November 1955 in all states except Trengganu and Johore.

Results

Kedah

Kelantan

Malacca

Negri Sembilan

Pahang

Penang

Perak

Perlis

Selangor

References

State elections in Malaysia
State